McKendree Township is a township in Vermilion County, Illinois, USA.  As of the 2010 census, its population was 807 and it contained 344 housing units.  Forest Glen Preserve is located in this township.

History
This area was originally part of Georgetown Township, but growing dissatisfaction with a lack of development in that portion of the township, compared with the Georgetown and Westville areas, led to a petition for creation of a new township in 1912.  The name came from McKendree Methodist Church.

Geography
The stream of White Branch runs through this township.

Extinct towns
 Meeks

Adjacent townships
 Danville Township (north)
 Highland Township, Vermillion County, Indiana (northeast)
 Eugene Township, Vermillion County, Indiana (southeast)
 Love Township (south)
 Georgetown Township (west)

Cemeteries
The township contains eight cemeteries: Bock, Elwood Church, Locket, Lorance, McKendree, Michael, Niccum and North Fork.

Demographics

References
 U.S. Board on Geographic Names (GNIS)
 United States Census Bureau cartographic boundary files

External links
 US-Counties.com
 City-Data.com
 Illinois State Archives

Townships in Vermilion County, Illinois
Townships in Illinois